Vladislaus II, Vladislav II, Wladislaw II or Ladislaus II of Bohemia may refer to:

 Vladislaus II, Duke and King of Bohemia (1110–1174)
 Vladislaus II of Hungary (1456–1516)

See also
Ladislaus II (disambiguation)